Sterzh Cross is a stone cross formerly situated on the bank of the Sterzh Lake. It is now exhibited in the Tver History Museum, where it has been for over a century. Its height is 167 cm.

The cross was erected by Ivanko Pavlovich, a posadnik from Novgorod, in 1133. The inscription on the cross reads: "On 14 July, 6641 we started to dig a channel, whereupon I, Ivanko Pavlovich, erected this cross".

Novgorod Republic
Buildings and structures in Tver Oblast
Stone crosses in Continental Europe
Old East Slavic inscriptions
1133 works
Wayside crosses